L19, L-19 or L.19 may refer to:

Vehicles 
 Cessna L-19 Bird Dog, an American liaison aircraft
 , a submarine of the Royal Navy
 , a destroyer of the Royal Navy
 , a landing ship of the Indian Navy
 , a Leninets-class submarine
 Zeppelin L.19 (LZ 54), an airship of the Imperial German Navy
 L-19, a United States Navy L-class blimp

Proteins 
 60S ribosomal protein L19
 Mitochondrial ribosomal protein L19
 Ribosomal protein L19 leader

Other uses 
 Lectionary 19, a 13th-century, Greek manuscript of the New Testament 
 Wasco Airport, in Kern County, California